Princess Therese Natalie of Brunswick-Wolfenbüttel-Bevern (4 June 1728 in Wolfenbüttel – 26 June 1778 in Gandersheim Abbey, in Bad Gandersheim) was a German noblewoman.  She was a member of the House of Welf and was princess-abbess of the Imperial Free secular Abbey in Gandersheim.

Life 
Therese Natalie was the sixth daughter of Duke Ferdinand Albert II of Brunswick-Bevern (1680-1735) and his wife Antoinette Amalie (1696-1762), a daughter of Duke Louis Rudolph of Brunswick-Wolfenbüttel and Princess Christine Louise of Oettingen-Oettingen.  Therese Natalie was a first cousin of Archduchess Maria Theresa of Austria, Queen of Hungary and Bohemia.  She was a sister-in-law of King Frederick II of Prussia.

Efforts to marry Princess Therese Natalie with an Archduke of Austria or a French prince failed because she was unwilling to convert to the Catholic faith.  In 1747, she became a collegiate lady in Herford Abbey.  Around that time, it was decided that she would succeed Elisabeth of Saxe-Meiningen (1681-1766) as abbess of Gandersheim Abbey.  In November 1750, she was appointed canoness at Gandersheim.  Elisabeth died on Christmas Eve 1766, after 53 years in office.  As promised, Therese Natalie was elected as her successor.  She was enthroned on 3 December 1767.

During her period in office, Therese Natalie often stayed at the court of her elder brother Charles I in Brunswick.  She died in Gandersheim on 26 June 1778 and was buried in the ducal crypt below Brunswick Cathedral.  She was succeeded as abbess by her niece Auguste Dorothea of Brunswick-Wolfenbüttel (1749-1810), who would be the last princess-abbess of Gandersheim.

References 
 Martin Hoernes and Hedwig Röckelein (eds.): Gandersheim und Essen. Vergleichende Untersuchungen zu sächsischen Frauenstiften, in the series Essener Forschungen zum Frauenstift, vol. 4, Essen, 2006
 C. Römer: Braunschweig-Bevern, Ein Fürstenhaus als europäische Dynastie 1667–1884, Brunswick, 1997
 Kurt Kronenberg: Äbtissinnen des Reichstiftes Gandersheim, 1981
 Hans Goetting: Germania Sacra, New series, vol. 7: Die Bistümer der Kirchenprovinz Mainz, Das Bistum Hildesheim, part 1: Das reichsunmittelbare Stift Gandersheim, ed. by Max- Planck- Institute for History, Berlin and New York, 1973

External links 
 Dukes of Brunswick-Wolfenbüttel-Bevern 
 ThePeerage.com - Theresa Natalie of Brunswick-Wolfenbüttel

Abbesses of Gandersheim
New House of Brunswick
German duchesses
Lutheran abbesses
1728 births
1778 deaths
18th-century German people
Burials at Brunswick Cathedral
Daughters of monarchs